The Burning of Norfolk was an incident that occurred on January 1, 1776, during the American Revolutionary War.  British Royal Navy ships in the harbor of Norfolk, Virginia, began shelling the town, and landing parties came ashore to burn specific properties.  The town, whose significantly Tory (Loyalist) population had fled, was occupied by Whig (Revolutionary) forces from Virginia and North Carolina.  Although these forces worked to drive off the landing parties, they did nothing to impede the progress of the flames, and began burning and looting Tory properties.

After three days, most of the town had been destroyed, principally by the action of the Whig forces.  The destruction was completed by Whig forces in early February to deny use of even the remnants to the British.  Norfolk was the last significant foothold of British authority in Virginia; after raiding Virginia's coastal areas for a time, its last royal governor, Lord Dunmore, left for good in August 1776.

Background

Tensions in the British Colony of Virginia were raised in April 1775 at roughly the same time that the hostilities of the American Revolutionary War broke out in the Province of Massachusetts Bay with the Battles of Lexington and Concord.  Rebellious Whigs (also known as Patriots) in control of the provincial assembly had begun recruiting troops in March 1775, leading to a struggle for control of the colony's military supplies.  Under orders from John Murray, 4th Earl of Dunmore, the royal governor of Virginia, British marines removed gunpowder from the colonial storehouse in Williamsburg to a Royal Navy ship, alarming colonial legislators and prompting a militia uprising.  Although the incident was resolved without violence, Dunmore, fearing for his personal safety, left Williamsburg in June 1775 and placed his family on board a Royal Navy ship.  A small British fleet then took shape at Norfolk, a port town whose merchants had significant Loyalist (Tory) tendencies.  Although the town did have some Whig support, the threat posed by the British fleet may have played a role in minimizing their activity in the town.

Confrontations and minor skirmishes continued in Virginia between Whigs on one side and Tories on the other until October, when Dunmore had acquired enough military support to begin organized operations against the rebellious Whigs.  General Thomas Gage, the British commander-in-chief for North America, had ordered a small detachment of the 14th Regiment of Foot to Virginia in response to pleas by Dunmore for military help.  These troops began raiding surrounding counties for rebel military supplies on October 12.  This activity continued through the end of October, when a small British ship ran aground and was captured by Whigs during a skirmish near Hampton.  Navy boats sent to punish the townspeople were repulsed by Continental Army troops and militia in a brief gunfight that resulted in the killing and capture of several sailors.  Dunmore reacted to this event by issuing a proclamation on November 7 in which he declared martial law, and offered to emancipate Whig-held slaves in Virginia willing to serve in the British Army.  The proclamation alarmed Tory and Whig slaveholders alike, concerned by the idea of armed former slaves and the potential loss of their property.  Nevertheless, Dunmore was able to recruit enough slaves to form the Ethiopian Regiment, as well as raising a company of Tories he called the Queen's Own Loyal Virginia Regiment.  These local forces supplemented the two companies of the 14th Foot that were the sole British military presence in the colony.  This successful recruiting drive prompted Dunmore to write on November 30, 1775 that he would soon be able to "reduce this colony to a proper sense of their duty."

Virginia's assembly had sent companies of militia to Hampton under the command of William Woodford, the colonel of the 2nd Virginia Regiment in October, and further militia continued to arrive at Williamsburg.  Woodford, his force swollen to 700 men, advanced toward Great Bridge in early December.  Some of Dunmore's troops had fortified the north side of the bridge, so Woodford began entrenching the position on his side of the bridge, while more and more militia companies arrived from the surrounding counties and North Carolina.  On December 9, British troops attempted to disperse Woodford's force, and were decisively repulsed.  Following the battle, the British retreated back into Norfolk, and shortly after, Dunmore and his entire force withdrew to Royal Navy ships anchored in Norfolk's harbor, along with most of the remaining Tory population of the town.  Woodford's force continued to grow with the arrival of Colonel Robert Howe and North Carolina regulars the day after the battle.

Continental Army occupation of Norfolk
On December 14, with the Whig forces having grown by further militia arrivals to about 1,200, Howe and Woodford moved into Norfolk.  Since Colonel Howe held a senior Continental Army commission, he outranked Woodford, and assumed command of the occupying forces.  He adopted a hard line in dealings with Dunmore and the Royal Navy captains, denying the delivery of supplies to the overcrowded ships, and insisting on parity in the exchange of prisoners.

Howe and Woodford were also concerned about the possibility of a British attack, and at first appealed for additional troops.  However, on further consideration they realized that the British fleet could easily maneuver around the town and isolate the garrison.  They consequently recommended to the Virginia assembly that the town be abandoned and rendered useless to their enemy.

On December 20 the  arrived, accompanied by a store ship loaded with supplies and munitions. On Christmas Eve, Liverpool captain, Henry Bellew, sent what amounted to an ultimatum into the town, stating that he preferred to purchase provisions instead of taking them by force. Howe rejected the ultimatum, and prepared for a bombardment. On December 30, Bellew demanded that the Whig forces cease parading and changing the guard on the waterfront because he found it offensive, and suggested that it would "not be imprudent" for women and children to leave the town. Howe refused to withdraw his men, telling Bellew "I am too much an Officer [...] to recede from any point which I conceive to be my duty."

Burning and looting
On New Year's Day 1776, Howe's guards paraded as they had before.  Between 3:00 and 4:00 pm, the four ships of the British fleet opened fire on the town.  Mounting more than 100 guns, they cannonaded the town well into the evening hours.  Landing parties were sent ashore, some to obtain provisions, others to set fire to buildings that Whig snipers had been using as posts from which to fire on the fleet.  Although the British movements were not particularly well coordinated, they succeeded in setting most of the waterfront ablaze.

The Whig militia resisted the landing parties, but did little to stop the flames, which were spread by advantageous winds.  Some Loyalist properties were targeted for burning and looting by the Whigs shortly after the bombardment began, including a local distillery.  Although the British ended their operations that day, the fires continued to rage; the next morning Colonel Howe reported that "the whole town will I doubt not be consum'd in a day or two."  The burning and looting by the occupying Whigs continued for three days.  By the time order was restored, much of the town had been destroyed.

Aftermath

Damage to the town by the Whig forces significantly exceeded that done by the British, destroying 863 buildings valued at £120,000 (an estimated £ in modern pounds sterling).  In comparison, the British bombardment destroyed only 19 properties worth £3,000 (£); this was in addition to £2,000 (£) in damages done by Lord Dunmore during the British occupation of Norfolk.

Colonel Howe's report to the Virginia Convention omitted the role of the Whig forces in the burning, and repeated the recommendation that the town be destroyed.  A newspaper account published by Lord Rawdon prompted some questions in Whig circles about the event, but many assumed that British forces were responsible for most of the damage, and no inquiries were made in the immediate aftermath.  The convention approved Howe's plan, and by February 6 the remaining 416 structures had been destroyed.  It was not until 1777 that the full extent of Whig participation in the burning was acknowledged.

Whig forces withdrew from the ruins of the town after completing its destruction, and took up posts in other nearby towns.  They were further organized in March, when General Charles Lee arrived to take command of the Continental Army's Southern Department.  He mobilized the militia to evict Dunmore from a camp he had established near Portsmouth; Dunmore finally abandoned Virginia for good in August 1776.

While the lands at an already established Fort Nelson and what would later become Fort Norfolk had been fortified, these defensive positions were too weak to prevent the British Royal Navy from bombarding Norfolk. As a result, following the war, the U.S. Federal Government bought the fortified land in Norfolk and established Fort Norfolk. Both fortifications were reinforced and used to prevent any further naval assaults on the cities which lie on the Elizabeth River.     

There is a marker at St. Paul's Boulevard and City Hall Avenue in Norfolk commemorating the action.

See also

 Burning of Falmouth
 List of American Revolutionary War battles

Citations

General references

External links
 Norfolk Historical Society page on the burning
 1777 Damage report (PDF)

1776 in the United States
1776 in Virginia
Norfolk, Burning of
Norfolk
Conflicts in 1776
History of Norfolk, Virginia